Apparatchik  (APPAЯATCHIK), nicknamed Apak, was a science fiction fanzine by Andrew Hooper, Carl Juarez, and Victor Gonzalez. It was headquartered in Seattle, Washington. The first issue appeared in March 1994. Initially it was published weekly and became bi-weekly with #11. Then, its frequency was switched to tri-weekly with #65. It was a nominee for the 1996 Hugo Award for Best Fanzine. The final, 80th, issue was dated June 20, 1997.

References

External links
Apparatchik's website
"Fandom World-Wide Mourns Loss Of Hard-Hitting One-Stamp Newszine," Plokta 81; Aug. 25, 1997
Cheryl Morgan, "Anything but duff," Emerald City 17, Jan. 1997

Biweekly magazines published in the United States
Defunct science fiction magazines published in the United States
Magazines established in 1994
Magazines disestablished in 1997
Magazines published in Seattle
Science fiction fanzines
Weekly magazines published in the United States